Mannat Singh alias Sukhi Pawar(her other name)is an Indian actress, known for her work in Punjabi movies. She is mostly known for her performance in the Punjabi movie named Arsho, released in 2015. In 2017 she won the best supporting actress award in PTC Punjabi Awards for her performance in the movie Main Teri Tu Mera. Mannat Singh also sung a duet called "Jaa".

Films
Main Teri Tu Mera (2016)
Vaisakhi List (2016)
I Love Desi (2015)
Arsho (2014)
Tere Ishq Nachaya (2010)
Band Vaaje (2019)

References

External links 

 

Living people
Indian film actresses
Actresses in Punjabi cinema
People from Amritsar
Punjabi people
Indian Sikhs
1981 births